Paulo Jorge Almeida Silva (born 19 March 1992), known as Paulinho, is a Portuguese professional footballer  who plays for Real S.C. as a right or left back.

Football career
Born in Loures, Lisbon District, Paulinho played for four clubs as a youth, including S.L. Benfica from ages 9–16. He made his debut as a senior with Real S.C. also of the same region, and in 2016 signed with Grupo Sportivo Loures.

Back to Real for 2017–18, Paulinho played his first match in the LigaPro on 8 September 2017, coming on as a late substitute in a 0–3 away loss against S.L. Benfica B. He made a further 29 appearances during the season, in an eventual relegation.

References

External links

1992 births
Living people
People from Loures
Portuguese footballers
Association football defenders
Liga Portugal 2 players
Segunda Divisão players
Real S.C. players
GS Loures players
Sportspeople from Lisbon District